Kristiansands Idrettsforening is a Norwegian sports club from Kristiansand, founded in 1921. It has sections for athletics and handball.

The athletics team uses the stadium Kristiansand Stadion.

Its most prominent member is Andreas Thorkildsen, 2004 Olympic champion in javelin throw. Haakon Tranberg, 1946 European Championships silver medalist and Kristen Fløgstad, Norwegian record holder in long jump with 8.02 metres and 1972 Olympic participant, also represented Kristiansand.

External links
Kristiansands IF website 

Athletics clubs in Norway
Norwegian handball clubs
Sport in Kristiansand
Sports clubs established in 1921
1921 establishments in Norway